Kamal Ruhayyim (Arabic: كمال رحيم) (born 1947) is an Egyptian writer. He obtained a doctorate in law from Cairo University, before pursuing a career in law enforcement (police and Interpol). As an author, he is best known for the Galal trilogy, which consist of Diary of a Jewish Muslim, Days in the Diaspora and Menorahs and Minarets. All three books have been translated by Sarah Enany and published by AUC Press.

References

1947 births
Living people
Cairo University alumni
Egyptian writers
Egyptian people of Jewish descent